The Sony Vaio 700 series were Sony's first Vaio branded laptops, starting with the 705 and 707 models, launched in Japan on July 1, 1997, and subsequently in the United States.

The 700 series featured removable 3.5" floppy disk drive, removable 14x CD-ROM, 33.6kbit/s integrated modem, 12.1" screen, 2.1GB hard disk drive, 2MB VRAM, 128MB maximum RAM, IrDA port, lithium-ion battery, with optional second battery and an optional docking station with firewire, USB, mouse, keyboard, ethernet and SCSI.

The launch models offered an 800x600 screen (705) or 1024x768 screen (707), 256KB cache, 16MB (705) or 32MB (707) RAM a Pentium 1 MMX 150 or 166 MHz CPU, and Windows 95 pre-installed.

The 700 series was produced only in 1997 and 1998, later replaced by lighter models.

Models
PCG-705 - see above
PCG-707 - see above
PCG-717 - 705 upgraded with 200 MHz CPU
PCG-719 - 707 upgraded with 512KB cache, 233 MHz CPU
PCG-729
PCG-731 - 200 MHz Pentium MMX, 32MB RAM
PCG-735 - 233 MHz Pentium MMX, 64MB RAM
PCG-748 - 266 MHz Pentium MMX

External links
 
 
 

700